FC Karin, is a defunct Armenian football club from the capital Yerevan. The club was dissolved in 1994 and is currently inactive from professional football.

References

Karin Yerevan
1994 disestablishments in Armenia